The Herman R. Salmon Technical Publications Award recognizes the most outstanding technical paper published in Cockpit magazine, a quarterly journal of the Society of Experimental Test Pilots. The award was established in 1971 and renamed in 1981 to honor the memory of test pilot Herman R. "Fish" Salmon who was killed in an aircraft accident.

Criteria 

The Society lists five criteria for nominations to this award:

Originality and/or ingenuity of the article
Interest of subject material to the membership
Contribution to flight testing
Contribution to the exchange of information between test pilots that would not otherwise be generally available
Organization of material and clarity of presentation

Recipients 

Recipients of this award, from 1971 to present, include:

1971—John F. Farley
1972—Jack F. Woodman
1973—Gilbert Defer
1974—Pietro P. Trevisan
1975—Robert R. Stone
1976—William H. Brinks
1977—Richard G. Thomas
1978—A. W. "Bill" Bedford
1979—Charles A. Sewell
1980—LCdr. Richard N. Richards, USN; Carroll D. Pilcher
1981—No award was presented
1982—William H. Brinks
1983—Dennis D. Behm
1984—A. Paul Metz
1985—Walter Spychiger
1986—Frank C. Sanders; Jeff Ethell
1987—B. Pasquet
1988—Major Troy D. Pennington, USMC; Richard Kotarba
1989—Charles J. Berthe, Louis H. Knotts, Jeff H. Peer, N. C. Weingarten
1990—Paul W. Herrick
1991—George L. Wiser
1992—Michael Barnes; Cdr. John Deaton, USN; Jonathan Kern; Douglas Wright
1993—Maj. William A. Flynn, CAF; Keith L. Keller
1994—Louis H. Knotts, Michael L. E. Parrag, Eric E. Ohmit
1995—Allen T. Reed
1996—Eric E. Fiore
1997—Michale Swales
1998—Lt Col Carl Hawkins, USAF; Lt Andrew Thorne, USAF
1999—Capt Ron Rogers, ALPA
2000—Thomas Tilden, United Airlines
2001—Mr. Michael Adam-Swales, Agusta Westland Helicopter, Mr. Andrew Strachan, Agusta Westland Helicopters
2002—Capt Kevin A. Gibbons, USAF; Maj Philip K. Chionh, RSAF; Maj Mark R. Johnson, USMC; Maj James R. Marcolesco, USAF; Capt Collin T. Ireton, USAF; Capt David F. Radomski, USAF; Maj Andrew J. Thurling, USAF
2003—Mr. Bob Riser; LCDR Wade McConvey, USN 
2004—Sqn Ldr Shaun Wildey, RAF
2005—Richard V. Reynolds, Lt Gen, USAF (Ret)
2006—Dr. Guy Gratton, Dr. Simon Newman
2007—Lt Col Geno Wagner, USAF
2008—Lt Col Daniel D. Daetz, USAF; Maj Jack D. Fischer, USAF; Brian Knaup, USAF
2009—Dr. Allen Peterson, Sierra Nevada Corporation
2010—Maj Aaron A. Tucker, USAF (M), Maj Christopher E. Childress, USAF (M), and Lt Col Robert J. Poremski, USAF
2011—Mark A. Mitchell, Norman E. Howell
2012—Nicola Pecile, National Test Pilot School and Lt Col Raffaele Di Caprio, Italian Air Force
2013—LTC Jeffrey Trang, USA (Ret) (AF), American Eurocopter, Denis Hamel, American Eurocopter
2014—Robert Moreau, FedEx
2015—David L. Lawrence
2016—Timothy S. McDonald, U.S. Air Force Test Pilot School
2017—LTC Tucker Hamilton, USAF
2018—James E. ″JB″ Brown, III, National Test Pilot School
2019 - Dr. Brian Lee and Dr. Kirk Vining, The Boeing Company
2020 - Maj Gen Desmond Barker, SAAF (Ret)
2021 - Robert Hierl
2022 - James E. ″JB″ Brown, III, National Test Pilot School

See also

 List of aviation awards

References

Aviation awards